HaTzeirim (lit The Youth) was a short-lived political faction in Israel in the late 1990s.

Background
The faction was formed on 23 March 1999, during the 14th Knesset, when Centre Party MK Eliezer Sandberg broke away from his party and established a single-member parliamentary group.

However, the faction was short-lived, as a week after its creation, Sandberg joined the Shinui group. He was later part of a group that broke away to form Secular Faction and then National Home, which merged into Likud.

External links
HaTzeirim Knesset website

Political parties established in 1999
Political parties disestablished in 1999
Defunct political parties in Israel
1999 establishments in Israel